Josip Drmić (born 8 August 1992) is a Swiss professional footballer who plays as a striker for Prva HNL club Dinamo Zagreb and the Switzerland national team.

Drmić began his career with Zürich and moved to 1. FC Nürnberg in 2013, where he scored 17 goals  in his first Bundesliga season. He then moved to Bayer Leverkusen for one season and was signed by Borussia Mönchengladbach, who loaned him to Hamburger SV in 2016. After playing in the Premier League for Norwich City he moved to the Croatian Football League in 2021, playing for Rijeka and Dinamo Zagreb

A full international since 2012, Drmić has earned over 30 caps for Switzerland, representing them at the 2012 Olympics and the 2014 and 2018 FIFA World Cups.

Early life
Drmić was born in Lachen, Canton of Schwyz, to ethnic Bosnian Croat parents from Vitez, and is a dual national.

He applied for Swiss nationality at the age of 16, taking the exam three times in front of commissioners in his home village of Freienbach. On the second attempt, he was rejected because he knew more about Zürich, where he had spent six years in a football school, than the village. He then hired a lawyer who made the case that this was acceptable as Zürich is nearby and of importance to the community.

Club career

Zürich
Drmić began his playing career at Zürich and rose through the youth ranks, soon playing regularly for Zürich's reserve team. He eventually made his league debut on 6 February 2010 against Neuchâtel Xamax, coming on as a substitute. He scored his first Swiss Super League goal in a 1–1 away draw against Luzern on 4 February 2012.

During the 2012–13 season, Drmić scored 13 goals in 31 Super League matches and 19 goals from 39 matches in all competitions.

1. FC Nürnberg

In July 2013, Drmić joined Bundesliga club 1. FC Nürnberg on a four-year contract. On 18 August, he scored his first Bundesliga goal in a 2–2 draw against Hertha BSC. He finished his first season with 17 league goals, the third most by any player in the league, behind Borussia Dortmund's Robert Lewandowski and Bayern Munich's Mario Mandžukić. However, his team was relegated to the 2. Bundesliga.

Bayer Leverkusen
On 12 May 2014, Drmić agreed to sign a five-year deal with Bayer Leverkusen, for an undisclosed fee. He made his debut on 19 August as an 88th-minute substitute for Hakan Çalhanoğlu as the side won 3–2 away against Copenhagen in the first leg of their UEFA Champions League play-off.

Drmić made his league debut on 12 September by replacing Stefan Kießling in added time of a 3–3 draw at home against Werder Bremen. Nine days later, he scored his first goal for the team, starting and then equalising in the 29th minute of a 4–1 defeat at VfL Wolfsburg. He added his first brace for the club on 29 November, as a half-time replacement for Stefan Kießling in a 5–1 win over 1. FC Köln. On 13 March 2015, he added another brace for his fifth and sixth goals of the league season, in a 4–0 home win over VfB Stuttgart. Drmić was the only Leverkusen player to miss in the penalty shootout against Bayern Munich on 8 April; his attempt was saved by Manuel Neuer, which eliminated the team from the quarter-finals of the DFB-Pokal.

Borussia Mönchengladbach
On 17 June 2015, Drmić joined his third Bundesliga club, Borussia Mönchengladbach, on a four-year deal. He made his debut on 10 August, starting in a 4–1 win at FC St. Pauli in the first round of the DFB-Pokal. Five days later, he made his league bow in a 4–0 loss at Borussia Dortmund. Drmić totalled only one goal from 19 matches across all competitions before leaving on loan. His only goal came on 28 November, a header as Mönchengladbach came from behind to draw 3–3 at 1899 Hoffenheim.

On 1 February 2016, Drmić joined fellow league team Hamburger SV on loan until the end of the season. He debuted six days later, starting in a 1–1 draw with 1. FC Köln at the Volksparkstadion. On 27 February, he scored the only goal of his loan, opening a home match of the same score against FC Ingolstadt.

Following an absence through a knee injury, Drmić made his comeback on 28 October 2017, playing the first 52 minutes of Borussia Mönchengladbach II's 3–0 home loss to SC Verl in the Regionalliga.

Due to back injury and a muscle tear, Drmić played only five times in the 2018–19 Bundesliga, scoring twice.

Norwich City
On 25 June 2019, Drmić joined Norwich City on a free transfer, signing a three-year deal. He was persuaded to join them by their Swiss defender Timm Klose. He made his Premier League debut on 8 August, coming on as an 83rd-minute substitute for Teemu Pukki in a 4–1 loss at European champions Liverpool. On 5 October, again as a late replacement for the Finn, he scored his first goal as consolation in a 5–1 home loss to Aston Villa.

Drmić scored the equaliser on 4 March 2020 as Norwich drew 1–1 away to Tottenham Hotspur in the fifth round of the FA Cup, then won on penalties to reach the last eight of the tournament for the first time since 1992.

Rijeka (loan)
On 5 February 2021, Drmić joined Rijeka on loan until the end of the 2020–21 season. He scored his first goal on 17 March in a 3–1 victory over Slaven Belupo. 

On 6 July 2021, the loan was extended for the 2021–22 season. He scored in each of his three appearances in the season's national cup, opening a 3–1 loss to Adriatic rivals Hajduk Split in the final; in the league he was second top scorer with 21 goals including a hat-trick in a 5–3 win at Šibenik on 30 April.

Dinamo Zagreb
Drmić signed for Dinamo Zagreb on 7 June 2022, receiving the squad number 18. He made his debut on 9 July in a penalty shootout victory over Split in the Super Cup, being substituted for Mislav Oršić after 66 minutes. Six days later in his first league game, he scored twice in a 3–2 home win over city rivals Lokomotiva Zagreb.

International career

Eligible for Switzerland, Croatia and Bosnia and Herzegovina, Drmić represents his country of birth internationally, having played at under-19, under-21 and senior level. He stated that he opted for Switzerland after nobody from the Croatian Football Federation reached out to him. He was a member of Switzerland's squad at the 2012 Summer Olympics, and came on as a substitute in the last two matches as the team were eliminated in last place in Group B.

On 11 September 2012, Drmić won his first cap for the Switzerland senior team in a 2–0 2014 FIFA World Cup qualifying win over Albania. He scored his first two international goals in a 2–2 draw with Croatia on 6 March 2014.

On 13 May 2014, Drmić was named in Switzerland's squad for the 2014 World Cup. He scored the only goal of the match in the 83rd minute from Blerim Džemaili's assist as Switzerland beat Jamaica in a warm-up match for the tournament on 30 May. In the first match of the tournament, a 2–1 win over Ecuador, he had a goal ruled out for offside and was substituted for Haris Seferovic, who scored the winning goal. Drmić was dropped for Seferovic for the second match, a 5–2 defeat to France, but returned and set up two of Xherdan Shaqiri's three goals in the 3–0 win over Honduras in the last group match in Manaus, which saw Switzerland advance to the knockout stage as group runners-up.

Drmić scored his first competitive goal for Switzerland on 14 June 2015, equalising in a 2–1 away victory over Lithuania in UEFA Euro 2016 qualifying. On 5 September, he came on in the 64th minute for Blerim Džemaili, and scored twice as the Swiss came from 0–2 down to defeat Slovenia 3–2 in a qualifier in Basel. After having knee surgery in March, he missed the final tournament.

In qualification for the 2018 World Cup, Drmić scored once, the sole goal of a victory over Latvia at the Stade de Genève on 25 March 2017. It was his first goal in any match since February 2016, heading an Admir Mehmedi cross two minutes after coming on in place of Gelson Fernandes. Manager Vladimir Petković named him for the squad to compete in the finals in Russia. In the final group game against Costa Rica in Nizhny Novgorod, he came on as a late substitute for Mario Gavranović and scored in a 2–2 draw that ensured passage to the last 16.

At the 2018–19 Nations League in Portugal, Drmić was the only player to miss in the third-place penalty shootout against England, with Jordan Pickford saving from him in sudden death.

Career statistics

Club

International

Scores and results list Switzerland's goal tally first.

Honours
Rijeka
 Croatian Cup runner-up: 2021–22

Dinamo Zagreb
 Croatian Super Cup: 2022

References

External links

Josip Drmić at db.fcz 

1992 births
1. FC Nürnberg players
2014 FIFA World Cup players
2018 FIFA World Cup players
Association football forwards
Bayer 04 Leverkusen players
Borussia Mönchengladbach players
Borussia Mönchengladbach II players
Bundesliga players
Expatriate footballers in England
Expatriate footballers in Germany
Expatriate footballers in Croatia
FC Zürich players
Footballers at the 2012 Summer Olympics
Hamburger SV players
Living people
Naturalised citizens of Switzerland
Citizens of Croatia through descent
Norwich City F.C. players
HNK Rijeka players
GNK Dinamo Zagreb players
Olympic footballers of Switzerland
Sportspeople from the canton of Schwyz
Premier League players
Regionalliga players
Croatian Football League players
Swiss expatriate footballers
Swiss expatriate sportspeople in England
Swiss expatriate sportspeople in Germany
Swiss expatriate sportspeople in Croatia
Swiss men's footballers
Swiss people of Croatian descent
Swiss Super League players
Switzerland international footballers
Switzerland under-21 international footballers
Switzerland youth international footballers
Swiss people of Bosnia and Herzegovina descent